The Musashino Forest Sport Plaza is a multi-sport venue located in Chōfu, Tokyo, Japan. The main arena has a seating capacity of over 10,000, and also includes a swimming pool, a gym, a multi-use sports area and two fitness studios, that is available for use by the general public. It is the first new venue completed for Tokyo 2020. Construction took three and a half years and cost over $300 million to complete.

In October 2018, the venue hosted the Japan Open Tennis Championships as the Ariake Coliseum is being renovated for the tennis events at the 2020 Summer Olympics. It was used for staging the 2020 Summer Olympics badminton tournaments and is hosting the badminton and fencing competitions as well as wheelchair basketball games for the 2020 Summer Paralympics.

References

Venues of the 2020 Summer Olympics
Basketball venues in Japan
Chōfu, Tokyo
Swimming venues in Japan
Sports venues in Tokyo
Sports venues completed in 2017
2017 establishments in Japan
Olympic badminton venues
Multi-purpose stadiums in Japan